In the United States, a political party committee is an organization, officially affiliated with a political party and registered with the Federal Elections Commission (FEC), which raises and spends money for political campaigning. Political party committees are distinct from political action committees, which are formally independent of political parties and subject to different rules.

Though their own internal rules differ, the two major political parties (Democrats and Republicans) have essentially parallel sets of committees. (Third parties have varied organizational structures, although several do have national committees officially recognized by the FEC.)

National committees
The Democratic National Committee, Reform Party National Committee, Green National Committee, Libertarian National Committee, and Republican National Committee are the official central organizations for their respective parties. They have the greatest role in presidential election years when they are responsible for planning the nominating convention and also spend heavily in support of their party's nominee (some of this spending is directly coordinated with the nominee's campaign; the rest is in independent expenditures).

The two major parties also have two national Hill committees, controlled by their caucus leadership in each house of Congress, which work specifically to elect members of their own party to Congress.

The individual contribution limit to a single national party committee is currently $32,400 per calendar year, but is indexed to inflation.

State and local committees
State party organizations typically have both federal and non-federal accounts, and money can be transferred between the two under certain circumstances. (A third and more complicated category of money, Levin funds, has been created by the Bipartisan Campaign Reform Act.) The federal limit for individual contributions to state and local party committees is a combined total of $10,000 per year.

In most states, legislative campaign committees or assembly campaign committees are operated by political parties in order to raise funds and campaign for the election of party members to the state legislatures. These are federated under such national organizations as the Democratic Legislative Campaign Committee (formed in 1994) and Republican Legislative Campaign Committee (formed in 2002).

See also
Politics of the United States
Independent expenditure committee

Political parties in the United States